is a national highway connecting Takamatsu and Kōchi in Japan.

Route data
Length: 139.9 km (86.9 mi)
Origin: Takamatsu (originates at junction with Routes 11 and 30)
Terminus: Kōchi (ends at the origin of Routes 33, 55, 194, 195 and 197, the terminus of Route 55)
Major cities: Miyoshi

History
1952-12-04 - First Class National Highway 32 (from Takamatsu to Kōchi)
1965-04-01 - General National Highway 32 (from Takamatsu to Kōchi)

Municipalities passed through
Kagawa Prefecture
Takamatsu - Ayagawa - Marugame - Manno - Mitoyo
Tokushima Prefecture
Kōchi Prefecture

Intersects with

Kagawa Prefecture
Tokushima Prefecture
Kōchi Prefecture

References

032
Roads in Kagawa Prefecture
Roads in Kōchi Prefecture
Roads in Tokushima Prefecture